Ann Elizabeth Peoples ( Murphy; January 31, 1947 – November 12, 2019) was an American politician from Maine. A Democrat, Peoples was elected for the third time in 2010 to represent part of Westbrook, Cumberland County. She also has served on the Westbrook City Council and Planning Board.

Peoples was unable to seek re-election to the Maine House of Representatives for a 5th consecutive term in 2014 due to term-limits. She was replaced by fellow Democrat Dillon Bates. Bates resigned from the seat in September 2018. Peoples was elected again to the Maine House in November 2018, defeating Republican Jim Borque.

Peoples died on November 12, 2019.

References

1947 births
2019 deaths
Politicians from Indianapolis
Politicians from Westbrook, Maine
Democratic Party members of the Maine House of Representatives
Women state legislators in Maine
Maine city council members
Women city councillors in Maine
21st-century American women